Anfuso is an Italian surname, and may refer to:

Filippo Anfuso (1901–1963), Italian writer, diplomat and Fascist politician
Victor Anfuso (1905–1966), Democratic member of the United States House of Representatives

See also
Alfonso of Capua, also called Anfuso